A constitutional convention was called to change the 1935 Constitution of the Philippines, written to establish the Commonwealth of the Philippines. A special election was held on November 10, 1970 to elect the convention's delegates, which would convene in 1971.

Former Philippine President Carlos P. Garcia was sworn in as the President of the Constitutional Convention on June 1, 1971. However, he died thirteen days after taking oath. Former President Diosdado Macapagal replaced Garcia. Sotero H. Laurel served as the President Pro-Tempore of the convention.

Other prominent delegates were former Senators Raul Manglapus and Roseller T. Lim. Other delegates would become influential political figures, including Hilario Davide Jr., Marcelo Fernan, Sotero Laurel, Aquilino Pimentel, Jr., Teofisto Guingona, Jr., Raul Roco, Edgardo Angara, Richard Gordon, Margarito Teves and Federico Dela Plana.

The work of the Convention was affected by the declaration of martial law in September 1972 by President Ferdinand Marcos.  Eventually, on November 29, 1972, the Convention approved the new constitution. It was submitted to a vote in the 1973 constitutional plebiscite.  The results of the plebiscite and the legality of the 1973 Constitution was questioned before the Philippine Supreme Court in the Ratification Cases.  The constitution was upheld.  Marcos' dictatorship would continue to rule until being ousted by the People Power Revolution in 1986.

Election

Delegates

See also
 Philippine Constitutional Convention of 1971
 Commission on Elections
 Politics of the Philippines
 Philippine elections
 Philippine Constitution

References

External links
 The composition of the 1971 Constitutional Convention that created the 1973 Constitution, detailing the number of delegates per province, Presidential Communications Development and Strategic Planning Office
 Official website of the Commission on Elections

1970
1970 elections in the Philippines
Presidency of Ferdinand Marcos